Sevy may refer to:

 Jeff Sevy (born 1950), American American football player
 Sevy Peak, Idaho, United States